Andrew Bogle may refer to:

 Andrew Bogle, a figure in the Tichborne case
 Andrew Cathcart Bogle (1829–1890), recipient of the Victoria Cross
 Andrew Nisbet Bogle (1868–1957), Scottish minister of the Free Church of Scotland

See also
 Bogle (surname)